The 2011-12 Israeli Basketball State Cup was the 52nd edition of the Israeli Basketball State Cup, organized by the Israel Basketball Association. A total of 26 teams took part in the competition. The semifinals and finals were played at the Nokia Arena in Tel Aviv.

Maccabi Tel Aviv defeated Maccabi Rishon LeZion 82-69 in the final, successfully defending their title. It was Maccabi Tel Aviv's 38th Israeli State Cup.

First round

Bracket

Semifinals

Final

See also
2011–12 Israeli Basketball Super League
Israeli Basketball State Cup

2011-12
State Cup